Upper Stowport is a locality and small rural community in the local government area of Burnie in the North West region of Tasmania.
The 2016 census determined a population of 105 for the state suburb of Upper Stowport.

History
The locality was gazetted in 1966.

Geography
Chasm Creek forms part of the eastern boundary, and the Emu River forms most of the western boundary.

Road infrastructure
The C114 route (Upper Stowport Road / Lottah Road) enters from the north-east, runs south-west to the centre, and turns east before exiting.

References

Burnie, Tasmania
Towns in Tasmania